Sunderland Corporation Tramways operated a tramway service in Sunderland (then part of County Durham) between 1900 and 1954.

History

In 1900 Sunderland Corporation bought the Sunderland Tramways Company which had operated a horse-drawn tramway in the town since 1879.

Electrification of the service took place rapidly with the first converted service opening from Roker to Christ Church on 15 August 1900. The remaining services were upgraded by 1904.

During the First World War Sunderland, like many other local authorities, employed women on the tramcars as conductresses.  There were 10 employed by 1915, although on lower wages than their male counterparts - 6s - 10s per week, compared with 11s - 15s per week for the men.

In April 1916, the town was attacked by a Zeppelin, and tram no 10 was badly damaged, along with the Tramway offices.

By 1920 the conductresses had retired, as the men who had returned from the war returned to their previous employment.

On 3 January 1921 the company started a joint service with the Sunderland District Electric Tramways to Houghton-le-Spring. On 2 December 1925 a new route was opened along Durham Road to Barnes Park, and then further extended four years later to  Humbledon Hill. Twelve years later, the route along Fulwell Lane was extended on 10 May 1937 along Dykelands Road to Seaburn.

In 1932 two tramcars were obtained from the Mansfield and District Light Railways.

In 1948 the Durham Road line was extended to Grindon Lane, and in 1949 on to Thorney Close Road.

In the 1950s tram services began to close, beginning with the Villette Road route in 5 November 1950.  On 1 October 1954 a final procession of trams left the Town Hall for Seaburn.  By 1959 the last of the tram lines had been taken up.

Depots

There were two depots. The main tramshed and offices were at Wheatsheaf corner in Monkwearmouth, grid reference , and workshops were located off Hylton Road, grid reference .

General Managers

Harry England 1900 - 1903
Archibald Dayson 1903 - 1928
Charles Albert Hopkins 1929 - 1948
Harry Snowball 1948 - 1952
Norman Morton 1952 – 1954 (General Manager of Sunderland Corporation Transport until 1969)

Surviving trams

Car 16 was withdrawn in 1954 and spent some time at a football ground and then as farm accommodation. It was purchased for restoration in 1989 and was restored in 2003. It is operational at the Beamish Museum.

Closure

The system was closed on 1 October 1954.

References

External links
 Sunderland Corporation Tramways at the British Tramway Company Badges and Buttons website.

Tram transport in England
Transport in the City of Sunderland